Nobody Owns Me is a 2013 Swedish drama film directed by Kjell-Åke Andersson. The film is based on the novel of the same name by Åsa Linderborg, and stars Mikael Persbrandt, Tanja Lorentzon och Sten Ljunggren. Mikael Persbrandt was nominated and won in the category Best Actor in a Leading Role at the 49th Guldbagge Awards.

Plot 
The film depicts a lone father's (Mikael Persbrandt) relationship with his daughter after his wife (Tanja Lorentzon) leaves him. It is a story about alcoholism, child vulnerability, but also about love, betrayal and left-wing politics in 1970s Sweden.

Cast 
 Mikael Persbrandt	as Hasse
 Tanja Lorentzon as Katja
 Ida Engvoll as Lisa, 25 years old
 Saga Samuelsson as Lisa, 11 years old
 Ping Mon Wallén as Lisa, 8 years old
 Sten Ljunggren as paternal Grandfather
 Barbro Oborg as paternal Grandmother
 Magnus Roosmann as Lennart
 Peter Carlberg as Roffe
 Anna Blomberg as Roffe's wife
 Linn Skåber as Sonja
 Anna Wallander as Görel
 Marie Delleskog as Teacher
 Eva Millberg as maternal Grandmother
 Nils Moritz as Julle
 Fernando Concha as Uncle Guido
 Kim Lantz as Man at the yard
 Roger Siik as Colleague at the steelworks

Production 
The film was shot between September 17 and November 12, 2012 in Trollhättan, Göteborg, Piteå and Luleå, from a script by Pia Gradvall. It was produced by Francy Suntinger, the company Filmlance International AB, and premiered on November 8, 2013.

References

External links 
 
 

Swedish drama films
Films shot in Gothenburg
Films shot in Trollhättan
Films shot in Piteå
Films shot in Luleå
Films directed by Kjell-Åke Andersson
Films based on Swedish novels
Films set in the 1970s
2010s Swedish-language films
2010s Swedish films